Joshua Ferris (born 1974) is an American author best known for his debut 2007 novel Then We Came to the End. The book is a comedy about the American workplace, told in the first-person plural. It takes place in a fictitious Chicago ad agency experiencing a downturn at the end of the '90s Internet boom.

Biography
Ferris graduated from the University of Iowa with a BA in English and philosophy in 1996. He then moved to Chicago and worked in advertising for several years before obtaining an MFA in writing from UC Irvine. His first published story, "Mrs. Blue," appeared in the Iowa Review in 1999. Then We Came to the End received positive reviews from The New York Times Book Review, The New Yorker, Esquire, and Slate, has been published in 25 languages, was a finalist for the National Book Award, and received the 2007 PEN/Hemingway Award.

The New Yorker published a short story by Ferris, "The Dinner Party," in August 2008. This story made him a nominee for the Shirley Jackson Awards.  Another story, "A Night Out," was published in Tin House'''s tenth anniversary issue. Other short fiction has appeared in Best New American Voices 2007 and New Stories from the South 2007. His nonfiction has appeared in the anthologies State by State and Heavy Rotation. The New Yorker included him in its 2010 "20 Under 40" list.

Ferris's second novel, The Unnamed, was published in January 2010. It garnered many prominent, although mixed, reviews. Kirkus Reviews called it "audacious, risky and powerfully bleak, with the author's unflinching artistry its saving grace." The New York Times review, by novelist Jay McInerney, called it "a road novel with severe tunnel vision.”

Ferris's third novel, To Rise Again at a Decent Hour, was published in May 2014. The novel was shortlisted for the 2014 Man Booker Prize in the first year that American works of fiction were eligible, and won the 2014 Dylan Thomas Prize and the National Jewish Book Award.

Bibliography

Novels
 Then We Came to the End (2007)
 The Unnamed (2010)
 To Rise Again at a Decent Hour (2014)
 A Calling for Charlie Barnes (2021)

 Short fiction 
 The Dinner Party: Stories (2017)

 "Mrs. Blue", Iowa Review 29.2 (Fall 1999)
 "Ghost Town Choir", Prairie Schooner 80.3 (Fall 2006)
 "It Would Be Life--", Phoebe (2007)
 "Uncertainty", Tin House 34 (Winter 2007)
 "More Afraid of You", Granta 101 (Spring 2008)
"The Dinner Party", The New Yorker, 11 Aug 2008
"The Valetudinarian", The New Yorker, 3 Aug 2009
 "A Night Out", Tin House 40 (10th Anniversary Issue)
"The Unnamed", Granta 109 (Winter 2009) [novel excerpt]
"The Pilot", The New Yorker, June 14 & 21, 2010
"Good Legs", The New Yorker, June 2, 2014
"The Abandonment", The New Yorker'', August 1, 2016

Essays and reporting
"Nine to Five", "The Guardian" (2007)
"The World According to Wallace", "The Guardian" (2008)

References

External links
Penguin Books interview (01/2008)
Powell's Books interview (02/2007)
Pop Entertainment interview (05/2007)
New York Times book review (03/2007)
Guardian Joshua Ferris excerpt (04/2007)
NPR Radio Interview on Fresh Air
Guardian Writers' Rooms
 Joshua Ferris on work in American fiction
The Dinner Party - short story
Joshua Ferris on David Foster Wallace
Announcement of Ferris winning the 2014 Dylan Thomas Prize (11/2014)

21st-century American novelists
University of Iowa alumni
University of California, Irvine alumni
1974 births
Living people
The New Yorker people
People from Danville, Illinois
Novelists from Illinois
Hemingway Foundation/PEN Award winners
American male novelists
American male short story writers
21st-century American short story writers
21st-century American male writers